KJKZ-LP,  virtual channel 27 (VHF digital channel 12), is a low-powered KKDJ Radio-affiliated television station licensed to Fresno, California, United States. The station is owned by Cocola Broadcasting.

KJKZ-LP formerly aired music videos from Bohemia Visual Music and La Mega Mundial.

Subchannels
The station's digital signal is multiplexed:

References

External links
www.amgtv.tv

JKZ-LP
Television channels and stations established in 1988
Low-power television stations in the United States
1998 establishments in California